WOES (91.3 MHz) is a non-commercial educational high school radio station that broadcasts from Ovid-Elsie High School in the U.S. state of Michigan. It is known as "The Polka Palace".

WOES began broadcasting radio in the Ovid-Elsie area on April 4, 1978, with 10 watts of power which increased to 553 watts in November 1981. In September 1997, it began broadcasting 24 hours/7 days/365 days per year. Internet radio broadcasting began on May 1, 2000.

WOES is the highest-powered high school radio station in Michigan. It offers a variety of programming including music, news, and sports.  Hosts include student and community DJs.

Sources 
Michiguide.com - WOES History

External links

OES
Radio stations established in 1978